Tatyana Nikitichna Sevryukova (30 June 1917 – 1981) was a Soviet track and field athlete who competed mainly in the shot put. She was the gold medallist at the 1946 European Athletics Championships and broke the world record for the event in 1948.

Career

Early career
Born in Tashkent in the Uzbek SSR, she was a member of various sports clubs during her career with the main ones being Moscow-based: Spartak from 1937 to 1945 and Dynamo Sports Club from 1946 to 1952. She was trained by Oleg Lakerbay and Dmitri Markov during those periods. A mark of  the year after was the best during that wartime year and she also ranked number one in 1943 and 1944. She placed herself at the peak of the sport nationally with wins at the Soviet Athletics Championships in 1939 and 1940, then again in 1944 and 1945. This was better than the official IAAF women's shot put world record, but because the Soviet Union was not an IAAF member at that point the marks were not officially recognised.

European champion
The 1946 season was Sevryukova's first full season in peacetime and she proved to be the world's best shot putter. She was also entered into the discus throw event and was the third best qualifier before throwing shorter in the final and finishing sixth overall.

World record
She achieved the mark at a competition especially organised as an alternative to the 1948 London Olympics, at which the Soviet's did not compete, and Sevryukova's mark was easily better than Ostermeyer's winning Olympic record throw. Her world record stood for a little over a year before Soviet rival Klavdiya Tochonova claimed the world record for herself, although it was not until 1950 that Anna Andreyeva improved the record beyond Sevryukova's unofficial best.

Sevryukova won her sixth and final national title at the 1947 Soviet Championships. She still ranked in the top three nationally in the three following years, with Anna Andreyeva and Klavdiya Tochonova placing above her at the national championships. The trio were the world's best, as reflected by their taking the top three spots on the global rankings from 1949 to 1951. The rise of two further throwers in 1952, Galina Zybina and Tamara Tyshkevich, saw Soviets occupy the top five spots and Sevryukova pushed down to fourth (her lowest placing since 1935). She had her last top three world ranking at the age of 36 in 1953 before her performances declined. She retired after the 1955 season.

Legacy
Sevryukova's career set the stage for future Soviet dominance of the women's shot put. She was the first ever Soviet woman to win a major international gold medal in the event and also the first ever Soviet to hold the official world record for the discipline. After her world record in 1948, the mark remained exclusively in Soviet hands until 1968: Tochonova, Andreyeva, Zybina, Tamara Press and Nadezhda Chizhova were the successive holders. Natalya Lisovskaya regained the title for the Soviets in 1984 and she remains the world record holder.

The Soviet Union was similarly dominant at major international competitions: after Sevryukova's European gold in 1946, only two athletes from outside the Soviet Union (Marianne Werner and Margitta Gummel) managed to win an Olympic or European gold medal in the thirty years after that.

Personal bests
Shot put:  (1952)
Shot put indoor:  (1948)
Discus throw:  (1939)

National titles
Soviet Athletics Championships
Shot put: 1939, 1940, 1944, 1945, 1946, 1947

International competitions

References

1917 births
1981 deaths
Sportspeople from Tashkent
Soviet female shot putters
Soviet female discus throwers
European Athletics Championships medalists
World record setters in athletics (track and field)